is a Japanese singer-songwriter.

Biography
Jun Horie was born in Tomakomai, Hokkaido. He graduated from Hokkaido Tomakomai Minami High School, and then concentrated on becoming a livehouse musician. His debut single "Memory Glass" (1981) sold 500,000 units and peaked at number 3 on the Oricon Singles Chart and peaked at number 2 on the Billboard Japan singles chart.

References

External links

Japanese male singer-songwriters
Japanese singer-songwriters
1960 births
Living people